St. Matthias Episcopal Church may refer to:

 St. Matthias' Episcopal Church (Omaha, Nebraska), listed on the National Register of Historic Places (NRHP) in Douglas County
 St. Matthias Episcopal Church (Asheville, North Carolina), NRHP-listed in Buncombe County
 St. Matthias Episcopal Church (Waukesha, Wisconsin), NRHP-listed in Waukesha County

See also 
 St. Matthias Church (disambiguation)
 St. Matthew's Episcopal Church (disambiguation)